Profenusa is a genus of sawflies belonging to the family Tenthredinidae.

Species:
 Profenusa pygmaea
 Profenusa thomsoni

References

Tenthredinidae
Sawfly genera